The 2018–19 Holy Cross Crusaders women's basketball team represents the College of the Holy Cross during the 2018–19 NCAA Division I women's basketball season. The Crusaders, led by thirty-fourth year head coach Bill Gibbons, play their home games at the Hart Center and were members of the Patriot League. They finished the season 18–13, 9–9 in Patriot League play to finish in fifth place. They advanced to the quarterfinals of the Patriot League women's tournament where they lost to Bucknell.

Roster

Schedule

|-
!colspan=9 style=| Exhibition

|-
!colspan=9 style=| Non-conference regular season

|-
!colspan=9 style=| Patriot League regular season

|-
!colspan=9 style=| Patriot League Women's Tournament

See also
2018–19 Holy Cross Crusaders men's basketball team

References

Holy Cross
Holy Cross Crusaders women's basketball seasons
Holy Cross Crusaders women's basketball
Holy Cross Crusaders women's basketball